Joseph Cooper (died 1725) was a pirate active in the Caribbean and the American east coast. He was best known for sailing alongside Francis Spriggs, and for the manner of his death.

History

Cooper's early life is not known. In 1718 he and six other pirates were tried in Philadelphia for capturing the 22-ton sloop Antelope in the Delaware River.  They were released for lack of evidence.

By 1725 Cooper was captain of the sloop Night Rambler. On November 14 they captured the Perry near Barbados and a French sloop the next day. Cooper took both ships to Aruba to divide the plunder, forcing their crews ashore, where the ship's doctor interceded and gave them food. The Perry’s boatswain John Upton willingly signed the pirates’ Articles and joined them. Later Upton escaped and claimed he'd been forced to sign; witnesses contradicted him and he was hung for piracy in 1729.

Shortly after capturing the Perry, Cooper was sailing alongside Francis Spriggs and Captain Shipton in the Bay of Honduras; Cooper intervened when Spriggs’ men threatened to torture a prisoner. The warships HMS Diamond and HMS Spence had been hunting Shipton and Spriggs in the area for a year. Spriggs and Shipton were caught ashore, but the Diamond engaged Cooper's ship at sea. Rather than face capture, Cooper used a cask of gunpowder to blow up the cabin of his ship.

See also
James Skyrme, Stede Bonnet, and Charles Harris - Three pirates who tried to blow up their ships to avoid capture but (unlike Cooper) failed.

References

Year of birth missing
18th-century pirates
1725 deaths
Caribbean pirates
Suicides by explosive device
People of colonial Pennsylvania